Chah Tut (also Romanized as Chāh Tūt) is a village in Bakesh-e Yek Rural District, in the Central District of Mamasani County, Fars Province, Iran. At the 2006 census, its population was 16, in 4 families.

References 

Populated places in Mamasani County